The UMC's was an American hip hop duo from the borough of Staten Island in New York City.

The group was composed of Haas G and Kool Kim, who released the critically acclaimed full-length album Fruits of Nature in 1991, which garnered chart success with the duo's No. 1 Billboard Hot Rap Single, "Blue Cheese", and No. 2 Hot Rap Single, "One To Grow On." (which contains a sample from "Ursalena" by Bill Cosby) In 1994, the duo released its second album, Unleashed, but split up soon after.

Since the group's break-up, Haas G (under the names Hassan and Fantom of the Beat) has focused on producing music, most notably garnering a No. 1 hit for Lil' Kim featuring 50 Cent, with "Magic Stick". Kool Kim reinvented himself as the controversial underground emcee NYOIL.

Discography
Fruits of Nature (Wild Pitch/EMI Records, 1991) U.S. R&B No. 32
Unleashed (Wild Pitch/EMI Records, 1994) U.S. R&B No. 63

References

American musical duos
Five percenters
Hip hop duos
Hip hop groups from New York City
Wild Pitch Records artists